Dr. Harold L. Paz is Executive Vice President of Health Sciences at Stony Brook University and Chief Executive Officer of Stony Brook University Medicine. He is the former Executive Vice President and Chancellor for Health Affairs at Ohio State University and chief executive officer of the Ohio State Wexner Medical Center. Prior to that, he served as Executive Vice President and Chief Medical Officer at CVS Health/Aetna.

Education 
Harold Paz attended the University of Rochester from 1973 to 1977. He graduated with a Bachelor of Arts degree in biology and psychology in 1977, and subsequently graduated with a Master of Science degree in life science engineering from Tufts University in 1979. Paz went on to receive a medical degree from the University of Rochester School of Medicine and Dentistry in 1982. Following medical school, he completed his residency training in internal medicine at Northwestern University Medical Center where he served as chief medical resident, in 1986. He continued his medical training at Johns Hopkins Hospital in pulmonary, critical care and sleep medicine where he was Eudowood Fellow. Paz also was a postdoctoral fellow in Environmental Health Sciences at the Johns Hopkins School of Hygiene and Public Health.

Career 
Paz was selected to serve as the fifth dean of the Robert Wood Johnson Medical School (Rutgers University Medical School), and chief executive officer of Robert Wood Johnson University Medical Group  only seven years after completing his training at Johns Hopkins in 1995.

In 2006, Paz was recruited to the Penn State Hershey Medical Center and Health System, where he held multiple leadership roles throughout his tenure, including chief executive officer, senior vice president for Health Affairs for the Pennsylvania State University, dean of the College of Medicine and professor of medicine and public health sciences. In addition to being one of the youngest and longest serving medical school deans in the nation, he was elected by his peers to serve as chair of the council of deans of the Association of American Medical Colleges from 2012 to 2014 and chair of the board of directors of the Association of Academic Health Centers from 2013 to 2014.

Following two decades as a medical school dean and health care CEO, Paz was recruited to Aetna in 2014 to lead clinical strategy and policy for all of Aetna's domestic and global business. Paz served as Executive Vice President and Chief Medical Officer and was a member of Aetna's executive committee where he advanced an innovative personalized health strategy. Called AetnaCare, this strategy focused bringing care into the home and local community by leveraging clinical analytics, member engagement, digital and telehealth solutions, along with value-based arrangements with pharmaceutical companies and physicians to address the social, behavior and environmental determinants of health. These efforts were fully realized when Paz served as medical lead for the integration planning process with CVS Health through May 2019.

At Aetna, Paz led Aetna's response to the national opioid crisis. One of a small group of insurers that have stepped up efforts to fight the opioid epidemic, Aetna created an enterprise-wide opioid task force in 2016, which was chaired by Paz. In June 2017, Paz authored an opioid strategy paper that discussed the complex issue of opioid addiction. In October 2017, Paz participated in the fourth public meeting of the President's Commission on Combating Drug Addiction and Opioid Crisis.

Paz joined The Ohio State University in June 2019 as the first Chancellor for Health Affairs, assuming oversight of clinical and academic health affairs of the over $4 billion Ohio State University Wexner Medical Center, as well as Ohio State's seven health science colleges. The medical center has over 27,000 employees and encompasses over 100 buildings, including seven hospitals, 25 core research labs and more than 20 research centers and institutes. The seven health science colleges include:

 College of Dentistry
 College of Medicine
 College of Nursing
 College of Optometry
 College of Pharmacy
 College of Public Health
 College of Veterinary Medicine

In August 2020, the Ohio State Wexner Medical Center Board of Trustees approved construction plans presented by Paz for a new $1.8 billion, 26-floor inpatient hospital tower with 1.9 million square-feet dedicated to enhanced research, clinical training and patient care. Scheduled to open in early 2026, this new facility will increase Ohio State's total hospital count to eight. Other major construction projects include three over 250 thousand square-feet ambulatory and surgical care buildings in Columbus’ outer loop, as well as an interdisciplinary research building and interdisciplinary education facility focused on interprofessional education across the health sciences.

In addition, Paz has been instrumental in steering one of the nation's largest academic health centers through the COVID-19 pandemic.  In May 2020, Paz participated in a panel at the Columbus Metropolitan Club to discuss Ohio State's strategies and innovative solutions for combatting the crisis. He also shared a coronavirus and vaccine update during a recent Bloomberg podcast  and discussed how telehealth has been used at the Ohio State Wexner Medical Center during a podcast with Becker's Healthcare.

Under Paz's leadership, the Ohio State Wexner Medical Center rapidly increased telehealth capacity and uptake, providing nearly 203,000 telehealth visits from March through July 2020, an increase from 96 in February 2020. Telehealth was a valuable response tool during the coronavirus pandemic, but is also an important part of the medical center's plan to drive healthcare into homes and the local community.

During his tenure at Ohio State, Paz has also focused on addressing social determinants of health. He has written about the relationship between food insecurity and health  and implemented programs, such as a partnership with the Mid-Ohio Food Bank, to help providers connect at-risk patients with healthy food. In addition, Paz led the creation of an Anti-Racism Action Plan to support structural and systemic change toward equity in health and well-being. The plan includes specific actions to be taken by Ohio State's Wexner Medical Center and each health science college to address the direct line between racism and health outcomes. In 2020, the medical center was ranked by Forbes as fourth best employer in the nation for diversity.

In October 2021, Paz began his tenure as Executive Vice President of Health Sciences at Stony Brook University and Chief Executive Officer of Stony Brook University Medicine in Stony Brook, New York. In this role, he leads academic, hospital, and community initiatives to ensure continued development of Stony Brook Medicine as a premier academic medical center and health system and a world-class leader in research and innovation.

In addition to his current role, Paz previously served as professor adjunct of internal medicine at Yale University School of Medicine. Paz is a member of the National Academy of Medicine (NAM) Leadership Consortium, and has served on the NAM Roundtable on Quality Care for People with Advanced Illness, and the NAM Action Collaborative on Countering the U.S. Opioid Epidemic  and the National Academy of Science, Engineering and Medicine Committee on Implications of Discarded Weight-Based Drugs. In addition, Paz serves on the Curai Health advisory board and the board of directors of Research!America. Most recently, he has served on the boards of Select Medical Holdings Corporation, the National Health Council, the Aetna Foundation, United Surgical Partners International,  the Association of American Medical Colleges, and the Association of Academic Health Centers. Previously, he served on the board of directors of the Dorothy Rider Pool Health Care Trust, Vyteris, Inc., the Life Sciences Greenhouse of Central Pennsylvania, a number of hospital and health system boards, as well as the Johnson & Johnson Bio-Science Advisory Board.

Speaking, contributed writing and awards 
Paz has received numerous awards including a named professorship at Robert Wood Johnson Medical School, and holds an honorary degree from Elizabethtown College. He has been listed among the 100 Physician Leaders of Hospital and Health Systems by Becker's Hospital Review. In June 2018 and 2021, Paz was listed as one of the 50 Most Influential Physician Executives and Leaders of the year by Modern Healthcare.

Paz has authored over 100 publications and his research has focused on quality management, clinical outcomes, healthcare effectiveness and employee health benefit design.

Paz speaks regularly about:

 transformation of the healthcare industry 
 health equity and bridging the racial divide in healthcare 
 creating a patient-centered health ecosystem
 personalized health  
 value-based models
 collaboration between health insurers and pharmaceutical companies 
 pharmacy leadership success

Personal life 
Paz was born in New York City. His parents immigrated to the United States after the Second World War. He later moved with his family to Duchess County, New York where he attended public school. Paz is married to Sharon H. Press, PhD, a child and adolescent clinical psychologist. They have two adult children. Paz has been involved in a number of philanthropic organizations including, most recently, serving on the board of directors of the Whitaker Center for Science and the Arts.

References 

Aetna employees
Business executives
Living people
Year of birth missing (living people)
Ohio State University people